Pathans in Kashmir (also called Kashmiri Pathans) include Pashtun people (Pathans) that may still follow Pashtunwali and speak Pashto as their mother-tongue who have settled in the Indian union territory of Jammu and Kashmir. While there are also a large number of people throughout Kashmir who claim Pashtun ancestry through forefathers who migrated to the region under the Afghan rule in Kashmir. While exact numbers are hard to determine, cursory estimates put the number of these Pathans or Pashtuns above 100,000. Many of these Pathans have over time absorbed Kashmiriyat and use Kashmiri language as their second language, although some people following Pashtunwali customs and aspects of Pashtun culture and Pashto are still notably practiced among the community, largely of them resides in district Ganderbal (gutlibagh)and Anantnag, there are also Pathans in district Kishtwar, Baramulla (Uri, Sherri, Kaleban) and Kupwara (Haihama).

History
There are a large number of Pashto-speaking Pashtuns in the Indian state of Jammu and Kashmir . Although their exact numbers are hard to determine, it is at least in excess of 100,000 for it is known that in 1954 over 100,000 nomadic Pukhtuns living in Kashmir Valley were granted Indian citizenship. Today jirgas are frequently held. Those settled and living in the Kashmir Valley speak Pashto, and are found chiefly in the southwest of the valley, where Pashtun colonies have from time to time been founded. The most interesting are the Kukikhel Afridis of Dramghaihama, who retain all the old customs and speak Pashto. They wear colorful dress and carry swords and shields. The Afridis and the Machipurians, who belong to the Yusufzai tribe, are liable to military service, in return for which they hold certain villages free of revenue. There are a few families in the capital city of Srinagar which claim their origins to Yusufzai and Achakzai tribes. The Pashtuns chiefly came in under the Afghan rule, but many were brought by Maharaja Gulab Singh under the Dogra rule for service on the frontier and are now found mainly in south-west region of Jammu.There is also a good number of nomadic Pashtun clan living in north and south state of Jammu and Kashmir.
In Jammu they usually reside in Poonch District and Jammu District who also speak Dogri (a Punjabi dialect) along with Pashto. While in districts of Bandipora District, and Baramulla District in the north while districts of Ganderbal District of southern Kashmir.   
Pashto is also spoken in two villages, Dhakki and Changnar (Chaknot), located on the Line of Control in Kupwara District of northern state of Jammu and Kashmir.In response to demand by the Pashtun community living in the state, Kashir TV has recently launched a series of Pushto-language programs.

Some solitary families of Sadozai, Achakzai Pashtuns are well known in Srinagar whose roots go to Kandahar. Many Pashto-speaking Afghans/ Pashtuns are also notably found in Indian Army and Jammu and Kashmir Police as well.
Very few people know that Afghan President , Najibullah Ahmadzai has himself studied at St. Joseph's School (Baramulla) .

A further small, scattered Pashtun population still exists in some major cities of India with large Muslim populations, with the majority of Pashto-speaking individuals residing in the Indian State of West Bengal and Assam. There is large Pashtun people and they belong to Ghilzai, Yousufzai, Kharoti, Afridi, Shinwari, Durrani Tribes, who also have adopted local languages of the respective areas they live in, as their second language. These Pathans, numbering around 14,161,have retained the use of the Pashto language and are still able to speak and understand it. 
Along with the pashto speaking Pathans, there are also groups of those who have completely mixed with the local cultures and some belong to high cultural strata. 
In July 1954 (shortly after the partition), some 100,000 Pashtun tribesmen living in Jammu and Kashmir who previously did not hold nationality effectively became Indian citizens. According to The Hindu, the ceremony was presided by the Prime Minister of Jammu and Kashmir Bakshi Ghulam Mohammad at the village of Gutlibagh near Srinagar, during which citizenship certificates were presented in batches. The prime minister paid a tribute to the Pashtun community for its "role in the country's liberation struggle" and also to Pashtun nationalist leaders such as Bacha Khan. Leaders of the Pashtun community pledged their loyalty to their adopted homeland.

See also
 Afghans in India
 Pathans of Bihar
 Pathans of Madhya Pradesh
 Pathans of Punjab
 Pathans of Uttar Pradesh
 Pashtun People

References

 

 Pathans in Kashmir Preserve Identity

Kashmir
Social groups of Azad Kashmir
Social groups of Jammu and Kashmir
Social groups of India